Sarayu Mohan (born 10 July 1989) is an Indian actress who appears in Malayalam films and television shows. She made her debut in the lead role with the movie Kappal Muthalaali in 2009.

Film career 

Sarayu started her career by doing minor roles in movies like Chakkara Muthu and Veruthe Oru Bharya. Her debut movie in a lead role was Kappal Muthalaali directed by Thaha. Her next movie was Chekavar, in which she played the protagonist Gauri. She paired with Bala in Sahasram, and in Four Friends with Kunjakko boban. She played a negative character in Four Friends. She also appeared in Kanyakumari Expressby TS Sureshbabu and Inganeyum Oraal. Karayilekku Oru Kadal Dooram was the movie in which she acted as Indrajith's wife. She did a guest appearance in Orkut Oru Ormakoot with Siddique. In Janapriyan alongside Jayasurya, Bhama and Manoj K Jayan, she played the role of Revathi which was a notable character. In Nadakame Ulakam, directed by Viji Thampi, she acted with Mukesh. She did a major role in Nidra, a directional venture of Sidharth Bharathan. She has worked in Husbands in Goa, alongside Asif Ali, Jayasurya and Indrajith, in which she appeared as a sly seductive girl, out for trapping men. She received many criticisms, both positive and negative, for this role. She had a guest role in Housefull, directed by Linson Antony. Meanwhile, she also stepped into Tamil through a movie directed by cameraman Madhu Ambatt, the shooting of which is in progress.

Recently she directed a short film, Pacha, which has the voice by actress Bhama. There are songs in the film, and a poem sung by the actress Ananya.

Personal life 

Sarayu married Sanal V. Devan on 12 November 2016.

Filmography

Television

Serials

Reality shows 

She published a book titled Njyayaraazhchakale Snehicha Penkutty, meaning "Girl Who Loved Sundays", which contains her own collection of poems and stories.She has acted in few advertisements.
She has performed in many stage shows in various countries. Before entering into the film field she anchored some television programmes.

She is associating with a group named "Disha" which does charitable activities.

References

External links 

Living people
Indian film actresses
Actresses from Kochi
1989 births
Actresses in Malayalam cinema
Actresses in Tamil cinema
Actresses in Malayalam television
Indian television actresses
21st-century Indian actresses